James Kincaid may refer to:
James R. Kincaid, American academic active since 1972
James Kincaid, American cotton merchant who lived in Kincaid-Anderson House, South Carolina
James Kincaid, first settler of Kincaid, West Virginia in 1807
James Galsepy Kincaid, allegedly gave name to Deep Water, West Virginia in 1871
James Kincaid, character in 1933 American western musical Riders of Destiny
James Kincaid, main character in 1942 American western Silver Queen
James Harvey Kincaid Stewart Lindsay (1915–2007), president of Bengal Chamber of Commerce and Industry
James Kincaid, American pilot who crashed in 1997 during an air show at San Marcos, Texas, U.S.
Jim Kincaid (1934–2011), American journalist
Jim Kincaid (gridiron football) (1930–2014), American football player